The Women's Discus Throw event at the 1980 Summer Olympics in Moscow, Soviet Union had an entry list of 18 competitors, with one qualifying group and the final (12) held on Friday 1980-08-01.

Medalists

Results

Final

Qualifying round
Held on Thursday July 31, 1980

See also
 1976 Women's Olympic Discus Throw (Montreal)
 1978 Women's European Championships Discus Throw (Prague)
 1982 Women's European Championships Discus Throw (Athens)
 1983 Women's World Championships Discus Throw (Helsinki)
 1984 Women's Olympic Discus Throw (Los Angeles)
 1986 Women's European Championships Discus Throw (Stuttgart)
 1987 Women's World Championships Discus Throw (Rome)

References

External links
 Results

D
Discus throw at the Olympics
1980 in women's athletics
Women's events at the 1980 Summer Olympics